John Patrick Griffin (born 1 August 1942) is a British businessman. He is the founder of Addison Lee cab and courier company.

Early life
John Patrick Griffin was born on 1 August 1942 in the UK to a civil engineering contractor father. He was raised in Kilburn from 9 years old attending Finchley Catholic High School. However, he left school with no qualifications after contracting tuberculosis from drinking the milk of a cow he had milked on a school visit to a farm.

Career
While Griffin was training as an accountant, his father's road and sewer building business got into financial difficulty. Griffin left accountancy training to help salvage the business, with some success. During this period, and wanting a flexible job to create extra income, Griffin started working as a minicab driver which turned into a full-time job.

Griffin eventually decided to move on from driving minicabs, deciding he could do a better job of running a minicab business. Together with another driver, he set about starting a company which today is known as West One Cars. However, Griffin was convinced to stay on with his original employer after his salary was quadrupled and only later decided to form his own company.

Griffin was convinced that his new company needed a name which started with an "A" for it to appear early in telephone directory listings. A colleague who lived in a squat in Addison Gardens said people seemed to think this was a very posh address, which Griffin supplemented with Lee. Addison Lee was founded in 1975, with half the company owned by investor Lenny Foster.

In 1976, Griffin founded the Private Hire Car Association in response to the Miscellaneous Provisions Act 1976. As chairman of the association, Griffin was vocal in the debate that led to the licensing of private hire operators in the UK.

He appeared on the television programme, The Secret Millionaire in December 2009.

He stepped down as chairman of Addison Lee in 2014, shortly after private equity firm Carlyle Group purchased a majority stake in the company in a deal worth £300 million.

Political affiliations
He is one of the top 20 donors to the Conservative Party.

Philanthropy
He is an "Enterprise Fellow" of The Prince's Trust. He has also made charitable contributions to the Variety Club Golf Society.

Personal life
He resides in Potters Bar, Hertfordshire, north of London, with his partner, Rita. He has two sons, Liam and Kieran, who both work for Addison Lee.

References

Living people
1942 births
People from Kilburn, London
British business executives
Conservative Party (UK) people
Conservative Party (UK) donors
British company founders
Businesspeople from London